The Women's Allam British Open 2017 is the women's edition of the 2017 British Open Squash Championships, which is a PSA World Series event (Prize money : 150,000 $). The event took place at the Airco Arena in Hull in England from 19 to 26 March. Laura Massaro won her second British Open trophy, beating Sarah-Jane Perry in the final.

Seeds

Draw and results

See also
2017 Men's British Open Squash Championship
2017 Women's World Squash Championship

References

2010s in Kingston upon Hull
Women's British Open
Women's British Open
British Open Squash Championships
Women's British Open Squash Championships
Sport in Kingston upon Hull
Squash in England